Pavel Yurievich Sidorenko (Russian: Павел Юрьевич Сидоренко; born 26 March 1987) is a retired Kyrgyzstani footballer who played as a midfielder.

Career

Club
On 3 March 2017, Sidorenko signed a one-year contract with FC Dordoi Bishkek.

In February 2020, Sidorenko announced his retirement from football. In May 2020, he became a part of Ilbirs Bishkek's coaching staff.

Career statistics

International

Statistics accurate as of match played 15 November 2016

References

External links 
 

1987 births
Living people
Kyrgyzstani footballers
Kyrgyzstan international footballers
Association football midfielders
Footballers at the 2010 Asian Games
Sportspeople from Bishkek
FC Alga Bishkek players
FC Abdysh-Ata Kant players
FC Dordoi Bishkek players
2019 AFC Asian Cup players
Asian Games competitors for Kyrgyzstan
Kyrgyzstani people of Ukrainian descent